Karin Jan Smithers is an American former actress. She is known for playing Bailey Quarters on the CBS sitcom WKRP in Cincinnati (1978–1982).

Life and career
Smithers grew up with her parents and three sisters in Woodland Hills, Los Angeles, and attended what is now William Howard Taft Charter High School there. She first reached the public eye as a teenager when she was profiled and featured on the March 21, 1966 cover of Newsweek seated on the back of a motorcycle. She received offers from Hollywood agents as a result of that appearance.

Smithers's first marriage was to Kipp Whitman from 1971 to 1972. From 1986 to 1995, she was married to actor James Brolin and was stepmother to his two children from a previous marriage; together they have one daughter, Molly Elizabeth (b. 1987). Smithers filed for divorce from Brolin in 1995.

After living in Halifax, Nova Scotia, Canada, she now lives in Ojai, California. In June 2014, Smithers attended a reunion of surviving WKRP in Cincinnati cast members hosted by the Paley Center for Media.

Television and filmography

References

Further reading

External links

Living people
Actresses from Los Angeles
American film actresses
American television actresses
People from Woodland Hills, Los Angeles
20th-century American actresses
William Howard Taft Charter High School alumni
21st-century American women
Year of birth missing (living people)